Nazem Kadri (born October 6, 1990) is a Canadian professional ice hockey player for the Calgary Flames of the National Hockey League (NHL). He was drafted by the Toronto Maple Leafs seventh overall in the 2009 NHL Entry Draft. He played his junior career in the Ontario Hockey League (OHL), first with the Kitchener Rangers and then the London Knights. He won the J. Ross Robertson Cup with Kitchener and was part of the Rangers team that lost to the Spokane Chiefs in the final of the 2008 Memorial Cup. Kadri has also represented Canada internationally at the 2010 World Junior Championships, where the team received the silver medal after losing the final to the United States 6–5.

From the beginning of the 2012–13 season to March 21, 2016, Kadri led the NHL in the number of penalties drawn with 164, 46 more than the second-placed player, Dustin Brown of the Los Angeles Kings. Kadri won the Stanley Cup with the Colorado Avalanche in 2022, becoming the first Muslim player to hoist the Cup.

Early life 
Kadri was born on October 6, 1990, in London, Ontario, the second of five children and the only son born to Samir and Suhayla Kadri. His grandparents were born in Kfar Danis, Lebanon, and moved to Ontario when Kadri's father was four years old. Samir Kadri wanted to play hockey during his adolescence, but his family could not afford for their son to play. When Nazem was born, his father decided that he should have the opportunity to play the sport. Kadri began ice skating at the age of two, joined his first hockey team when he was four years old, and was playing at the elite level within the next two years. The Kadri family also attended National Hockey League (NHL) games; despite living near Toronto, they supported the Montreal Canadiens.

Kadri was a successful hockey, basketball, and volleyball player, first at Jack Chambers Public School and later at A. B. Lucas Secondary School. By the end of his high school career, Kadri was fairly certain that he would be selected in the NHL draft. He also played minor ice hockey in the London Jr. Knights system of the Alliance Hockey organization, serving as team captain at multiple minor levels.

Playing career

Junior

Kadri began his OHL career with the Kitchener Rangers after being selected in the first round, 18th overall, of the 2006 OHL Priority Selection. During his second season in the OHL, he played 68 games, recording 25 goals and 40 assists (65 points). During that year's playoffs, Kadri helped the Rangers to an OHL Championship and a berth in the Memorial Cup final, where they lost to the Spokane Chiefs of the Western Hockey League (WHL).

After the 2007–08 season, Kadri was traded to the London Knights (his hometown team) in exchange for several draft picks. He played in 56 games for the Knights in 2008–09, recording 25 goals and 53 assists (78 points). Kadri was sidelined during the 2008–09 season when he suffered a broken jaw. He was selected to play for Team OHL in the ADT Canada Russia Challenge, but was unable to participate due to the jaw injury. Kadri was later invited to the Canada men's national junior ice hockey team's selection camp for the 2009 World Junior Championships but did not make the final roster. Also during the 2008–09 season, Kadri was chosen to play in the OHL All-Star Classic, where he suited-up for the Western Conference and scored one goal.

After the 2008–09 OHL season, Kadri was drafted by the Toronto Maple Leafs in the first round, seventh overall, of the 2009 NHL Entry Draft. He signed a three-year, entry-level contract with the club on July 6, 2009.

After being cut from the Maple Leafs, Kadri returned to play for the Knights in the OHL. He was selected to play for Team OHL in the 2009 Subway Super Series (renamed from the ADT Canada Russia Challenge). He was also selected to represent the Western Conference in the 2009–10 OHL All-Star Classic, his second appearance in the OHL's All-Star Game in as many seasons. On March 30, 2010, Kadri was named the CHL Player of the Week after recording nine points (two goals and seven assists) in three games. The OHL named Kadri the league's Player of the Month for April 2010, a month in which he recorded 26 points (9 goals and 17 assists) in 10 games.

Toronto Maple Leafs
Kadri attended training camp with the Maple Leafs prior to the 2009–10 season. He played in six pre-season games with the club, in which he recorded three goals and two assists. Then-Toronto head coach Ron Wilson had said prior to training camp that Kadri would need to be one of the team's top-six forwards to make the club; Kadri was ultimately returned to the Knights prior to the start of the NHL regular season.

Due to injuries to forwards Christian Hanson and Fredrik Sjöström, Kadri was called-up to the Maple Leafs under an emergency basis, making his NHL debut on February 8, 2010, against the San Jose Sharks. He did not register any points and finished with a −1 plus-minus rating. This was a one-game-only call-up, and he subsequently returned to the London Knights following the game. Ron Wilson said that he would most likely be with the Maple Leafs for the 2010–11 season, though this was in doubt after comments made by both Wilson and then-Maple Leafs general manager Brian Burke during the pre-season, indicating that Kadri had not played to the level they expected and was "running out of time" to prove himself. In addition, Burke was traditionally a strong supporter of rookies gaining experience at the American Hockey League (AHL) level prior to NHL careers. Kadri was included in the Maple Leafs' last round of cuts, and was subsequently sent to the AHL's Toronto Marlies for the start of the season. However, on November 12, Kadri was called-up by the Maple Leafs (along with fellow prospect Keith Aulie). On November 16, in a game against the Nashville Predators, Kadri recorded his first NHL point, assisting on a goal by Kris Versteeg. Two days later, on November 18, Kadri recorded his first multi-point night with two assists in a game against the New Jersey Devils.

On March 19, 2011, against goaltender Tim Thomas of the Boston Bruins, Kadri scored his first career NHL goal. Kadri was named to the AHL All-Star Game in 2012. Prior to 2012–13 season, Kadri began training under former NHL player and Maple Leaf Gary Roberts over the summer to gain muscle and "play more explosively". On January 19, 2013, when NHL play resumed after the 2012–13 NHL lockout cancelled much of the first half of the scheduled regular season, Kadri made the starting roster for the Maple Leafs in their season opener against the Montreal Canadiens. He would score the first Maple Leafs goal of the season with a powerplay mark assisted by Phil Kessel against goaltender Carey Price. Kadri finished the game named the game's first star. One month later, in a game against the Tampa Bay Lightning, Kadri had his first NHL fight, engaging with Tampa Bay's Victor Hedman. With the Maple Leafs losing 4–1 late in the game, Hedman delivered a cross-check to the back of Kadri, who then confronted the 6'6" defenceman. Punches were then exchanged before teammates and officials broke up the fight. On February 28, in a 5–4 win against the New York Islanders, Kadri scored his first career hat-trick. On March 30, he scored his second career hat-trick, and second of the season, in a 4–0 win over the Ottawa Senators. He would finish the season with 18 goals and 26 assists, finishing second only to Phil Kessel for the team lead in points and goals. On May 4, Kadri scored his first Stanley Cup playoff point, recording an assist on a goal by Kessel after Kadri sprung him on a breakaway. On May 13, he scored his first playoff goal against the Boston Bruins in Game 7.

On September 11, 2013, Kadri signed a new two-year, $5.8 million contract with Toronto. On November 13, 2013, Kadri delivered an elbow to the head of Minnesota Wild goaltender Niklas Bäckström. As a result, the NHL's Department of Player Safety issued Kadri a three-game suspension. During the 2013–14 season, his first full 82-game season, Kadri set career-highs in goals (20) and points (50).

Kadri was suspended twice during the 2014–15 season, the first internally by the organization for showing up late to a team practice; he received a three-game suspension. One week later, Kadri was suspended by the NHL: he received four games for illegally checking Edmonton Oilers forward Matt Fraser in the head. Despite these setbacks, Kadri recorded 39 points in 73 games to lead all Toronto centres in goals. In the subsequent off-season, he signed a new one-year, $4.1 million contract with Toronto.

On April 1, 2016, Kadri was fined $5,000 by the NHL for his second and third diving infractions of the season. The first came March 12 against the Ottawa Senators and the second March 21 against the Calgary Flames. On April 4, 2016, Kadri was again suspended by the NHL after he delivered a cross-check to the head of Detroit Red Wings centre Luke Glendening. Kadri received a four-game suspension for the incident, effectively ending his season, and as a repeat offender under the NHL Collective Bargaining Agreement, he was also fined $200,000. Despite these misdemeanours, Kadri's play throughout the season was strongly praised by Leafs management, most notably head coach Mike Babcock and general manager Lou Lamoriello. Further, Kadri was heavily praised for his penalty drawing abilities; although he was always complimented on this skill, it received much more media attention this season, with Kadri setting a league-leading best 49 penalties drawn during the season. Additionally, Kadri led the Maple Leafs in various offensive categories, including points (45) and assists (28). On April 13, 2016, following the conclusion of Toronto's season, Kadri signed a new six-year, $27 million contract with the team.

On January 23, 2017, in a game against the Calgary Flames, Kadri scored his 100th career NHL goal. During the Maple Leafs' first-round series with the Washington Capitals in the 2017 Stanley Cup playoffs, Kadri played approximately 95 minutes of ice time throughout the series when Toronto were at even strength to help push the series to six games. He ended the series with two points, a goal and an assist, in six games as Toronto were eliminated.

During the 2017–18 season, Kadri scored his fourth career NHL hat-trick in a 6–3 win over the Columbus Blue Jackets on February 14, 2018. During Toronto's first-round series in the 2018 playoffs against the Boston Bruins, Kadri was suspended three games for a hit on Tommy Wingels in Game 1. Toronto lost the series in seven games.

During Toronto's first-round series against Boston in the 2019 playoffs, Kadri was suspended for the remainder of the first round for cross-checking Jake DeBrusk in Game 2. The Maple Leafs lost the series in seven games.

Colorado Avalanche
On July 1, 2019, Kadri (along with Calle Rosén and a third-round pick in the 2020 NHL Entry Draft) was traded to the Colorado Avalanche in exchange for Tyson Barrie, Alexander Kerfoot and a sixth-round pick in 2020. He found success with his new team, serving as their second-line center, recording 19 goals and 17 assists in his first 51 games, before missing the rest of the regular season due to a lower body injury. The regular season was itself prematurely halted due to the COVID-19 pandemic, with the 2020 Stanley Cup playoffs held later in the summer in a bubble in locations in Canada. Kadri rejoined the team for the playoffs, and played a major role in the team's victories in the qualifying round and the first round. Colorado eventually lost to the Dallas Stars in the second round.

With the pandemic still ongoing, the NHL revised its format for a shortened 2020–21 season, with teams exclusively playing within their divisions. Kadri had 11 goals and 21 assists in 56 games played, while the Avalanche enjoyed an excellent season and won the Presidents' Trophy as the best team in the league, narrowly prevailing over divisional rivals the Vegas Golden Knights. Entering the 2021 Stanley Cup playoffs as one of the favourites, the Avalanche swept the St. Louis Blues in the first round. However, Kadri was suspended for eight games after an illegal hit to the head of Justin Faulk in game two of the first round playoff series. Kadri appealed the suspension, which was upheld by the league. Kadri would not return to the 2021 playoffs as the last game of his suspension coincided with Colorado's elimination in the second round by the Golden Knights. He later reflected on the situation, saying "I hate letting people down, I really do. And when I looked up from the ice and saw Justin lying there…I knew what was coming. I knew. When I was sitting in the penalty box, my mind was just spinning. I was frustrated with myself."

For the 2021–22 season, the NHL returned to its normal competition structure. It would be Kadri's best season to date, as he scored 28 goals and recorded 59 assists, setting new bests in assists and total points. For the first time in his career he scored over a point per game. Prior to sustaining an upper body injury in March, Kadri had been on pace to hit the 100-point threshold for the first time in his career. He missed eight games, but returned for the final games of the regular season. 

Kadri again found himself at the center of controversy when, in Game 3 of the Avalanche's 2022 playoff second round series against the Blues, he collided with Blues goaltender Jordan Binnington while charging the netfront. As a result, Binnington was forced to exit the game with a lower body injury and sit out the remainder of the series. The Avalanche, behind at the time, won the game. Blues coach Craig Berube, when asked about the incident, said only "look at Kadri's reputation. That's all I've got to say." Kadri denied that he had intended to injure Binnington, while Avalanche coach Jared Bednar insisted it was an accident resulting from a collision between Kadri and Calle Rosén, a Blues defenseman. Binnington was alleged by Kadri to have hurled a water bottle at him during an on-camera interview after the game. As a result of the incident, Kadri received numerous racist and Islamophobic threats on social media, to the point that the matter was referred to the city police. Despite this, in Game 4 he scored his first career playoff hat-trick, leading the Avalanche to a 3–1 edge in the series. Blues forward David Perron was later fined for cross-checking Kadri during the game. The Avalanche won the series, advancing to the Western Conference Final for the first time in twenty years. In Game 3 of the Western Conference Final against the Edmonton Oilers, Kadri was injured after being cross-checked into the boards by Oilers forward Evander Kane, and Bednar announced that he would miss the rest of the series "if not longer." Kadri underwent thumb surgery. Defying initial expectations, Kadri returned to play in Game 4 of the Avalanche's Stanley Cup Finals series against the Tampa Bay Lightning, scoring the game-winning overtime goal. The Avalanche would go on to win the Cup. Kadri's status as the first Muslim player to win, as well as the sport's most famous Muslim player, attracted attention afterward.

As a result of his strong player throughout the final season of his contract, there was considerable discussion around Kadri's next contract, with many speculating that he would be too expensive for the Avalanche to re-sign under the salary cap. Kadri, for his part, said that he desired to return to Colorado, but added "I've shown what my worth is and I'm just looking forward to watching this all develop."

Calgary Flames
On August 18, 2022, Kadri signed as a free agent to a seven-year, $49 million contract with the Calgary Flames.

International play

Kadri played for Team Ontario at the 2007 Canada Winter Games, where they won a gold medal. He first represented Canada at the 2007 Ivan Hlinka Memorial Tournament, where the team finished fourth. Kadri was invited to Canada's selection camp for the 2010 World Junior Championships held in Regina, Saskatchewan. After being cut in 2009, Kadri was selected to represent Canada in 2010. In Canada's preliminary round game against the United States, Kadri was one of the players selected for the shootout, scoring on goaltender Jack Campbell to help Canada secure the victory.

During the tournament, Kadri recorded three goals and five assists. During the tournament, Kadri attracted attention for his refusal to shake hands with Switzerland's Nino Niederreiter after their semi-final game. Kadri did not elaborate on the specifics of what caused his refusal, but did absolve Niederreiter of using an ethnic slur: "Obviously, in big games like that, guys tend to lose their composure a bit, but I didn't take offence to anything he said. It was just that I felt like I didn't have to shake his hand." Kadri later had second thoughts about his refusal, stating, "I regret it a little bit." During the gold medal game against the United States, Kadri had two assists including one on Jordan Eberle's game-tying goal with 1:35 left in the third period. However, Canada lost the game in overtime, leaving Kadri and his teammates with the silver medal.

Personal life
Kadri is named after his grandfather. He is also Muslim. Kadri was the first Muslim drafted by the Maple Leafs, and the highest drafted Muslim in NHL history until being surpassed by 2012 first overall pick Nail Yakupov. In high school, Kadri served as a member of his school's Muslim Student Association. Kadri is the fourth player of Lebanese descent to play in the NHL, following John Hanna, Alain Nasreddine and Ed Hatoum.

In July 2018, Kadri married his fiancée Ashley Cave at Casa Loma in Toronto. They had their first child together, a daughter named Naylah, in 2019.

In June 2020, Kadri became an inaugural executive board member of the Hockey Diversity Alliance, whose goal is to address intolerance and racism in hockey. 

Kadri was awarded the Key to the City of London, Ontario on 27 August 2022 by Mayor of London Ed Holder.

Career statistics

Regular season and playoffs

International

Awards and honours

References

External links
 
 
 Muslim Heritage information pertaining to his NHL Career at TheNational.ae

1990 births
Living people
Calgary Flames players
Canadian ice hockey centres
Canadian Muslims
Canadian people of Lebanese descent
Colorado Avalanche players
Ice hockey people from Ontario
Kitchener Rangers players
London Knights players
National Hockey League first-round draft picks
Stanley Cup champions
Sportspeople from London, Ontario
Toronto Maple Leafs draft picks
Toronto Maple Leafs players
Toronto Marlies players
Sportspeople of Lebanese descent